Bambang station is an elevated Manila Light Rail Transit (LRT) station situated on Line 1. The station is located in Santa Cruz in Manila, on Rizal Avenue. The station is named after Bambang Street, the street right beside the station.

Bambang station serves as the ninth station for trains headed to Baclaran and the twelfth station for trains headed to Roosevelt.

Transportation links
Commuters can take the many jeepneys, tricycles and taxis from Bambang station towards their destination in the Manila districts of Santa Cruz, Sampaloc and Tondo. The station is also served by buses plying Rizal Avenue.

See also
List of rail transit stations in Metro Manila
Manila Light Rail Transit System

Manila Light Rail Transit System stations
Railway stations opened in 1985
Buildings and structures in Santa Cruz, Manila
1985 establishments in the Philippines